Artichia  was an ancient Greek city located in the region of Epirus. The site is probably located somewhere in ancient Parauaea, now in the Përmet basin.

See also
List of cities in ancient Epirus

References

Sources

Cities in ancient Epirus
Populated places in ancient Epirus
Lost ancient cities and towns